The 2010 season is FC Seoul's 28th season in the K League Classic.

Pre-season
 In Mokpo, South Korea: From 5 January 2010 to 27 January 2010  
 In Gotemba, Japan: From 31 January 2010 to 17 February 2010

Pre-season match results

Competitions

Overview

K League

League table

Matches

K League Championship

League Cup

Group stage

Knockout stage

FA Cup

Match reports and match highlights
Fixtures and Results at FC Seoul Official Website

Season statistics

K League records

K League Championship records

All competitions records

Attendance records

 Season total attendance is K League Regular Season, League Cup, FA Cup, AFC Champions League in the aggregate and friendly match attendance is not included.
 K League season total attendance is K League Regular Season and League Cup in the aggregate.

Squad statistics

Goals

Assists

Coaching staff

Players

Team squad
All players registered for the 2010 season are listed.

(Conscripted)

(Out) 
(Discharged) 

(Conscripted)

(Conscripted)

(Out)
(Discharged)

(Out)
(In)

(In & Out)

(In)

Out on loan & military service

 In : Transferred from other teams in the middle of season.
 Out : Transferred to other teams in the middle of season.
 Discharged : Transferred from Gwangju Sangmu and Police FC for military service in the middle of season. (Registered in 2010 season)
 Conscripted : Transferred to Gwangju Sangmu and Police FC for military service after end of season.

Transfers

In

Rookie Draft 

 (Univ.) means player who go to university then back to FC Seoul.
 (After Univ.) means player who is joined FC Seoul after entering university.

Out

Loan & Military service

Technical report

Tactics

Starting 11 & Formation
This section shows the most used players for each position considering a 4-4-2 formation.

Substitutes

See also
 FC Seoul

References

 FC Seoul 2010 Matchday Magazines

External links
 FC Seoul Official Website 

2010
Seoul